The Bolivian rail network has had a peculiar development throughout its history.

History

Gauges
All railways in Bolivia are now  Metre gauge. The Antofagasta to Uyuni line was originally  gauge.

Maps

FCAB Line from Antofagasta

Rail link to Peru

Bolivia built a line to the shores of Lake Titicaca.

Lines in the south, east
 

A line from São Paulo, Brazil, enters Bolivia at Puerto Suarez and connects to this line at Santa Cruz. In the 1950s this last major rail system was completed. A line was intended to run from Santa Cruz to Trinidad (about 500 km) in the north center of the country, but never reached there, it ended north of Yapacani (150 km), from where since 2014 an industrial spur is under construction to the ammonia/urea factory near Bulo Bulo (60 km).

Spur lines were run to mining districts and the regional capital of Cochabamba.

Mamore and Madeira Railway

Another railway was a local line in the Amazonian jungle. The Madeira-Mamoré Railroad runs in a  loop around the unnavigable section to Guajará-Mirim on the Mamoré River.

Steel lines to the Silver at Potosi

Rio Mulatos-Potosí line is a train line in Bolivia, containing Cóndor station, the world's second highest railway station (4,786 m).

Future plans

The government of Evo Morales has proposed a rail line uniting La Paz,  Cochabamba, and Santa Cruz, connecting onwards to Brazil and the Pacific coast.

The department of Cochabamba and the national government are contracting design studies in 2011 for regional trains to run on two routes: Cochabamba-Caluyo-Tarata-Cliza-Punata-Arani and Sipe Sipe-Vinto-Cochabamba-Sacaba-Chiñata. A 180-day study on Sipe Sipe-Chiñata line is being carried out between August 2011 and February 2012. This project, known as Mi Tren, is under construction and due for completion in 2020.

International rail links to adjacent countries
 Argentina – yes –  both countries
 Brazil – yes –  gauge both countries
 Chile – yes –  gauge both countries
 Peru – Shipping by car float from  railhead in Guaqui to  railhead in Puno across Lake Titicaca

Incidents
In 2007 thieves had stolen 100 meters of Bolivian track overnight, and the morning freight had insufficient distance to stop.
Photo of the site shows locomotives 1021 and 951 remained upright, but extensive damage ensued.

See also

Transport in Bolivia
Interoceanic Highway
Trans-Andean railways

References

Notes

Bibliography

External links
Historia de los ferrocarriles en Bolivia
Ferrocarriles Bolivia. Del anhelo a la frustración. Desarrollo, producción, economía y dependencia.
Empresa Ferroviaria Andina (FCA)
Empresa Ferroviaria Oriental S.A.
Ferrocarril de Antofagasta a Bolivia
Ferrocarril de Guaqui a La Paz
Viaje en tren entre Sucre y Potosí

<Wikibase-sitelinks>